Nigel Martin Evans   (born 10 November 1957) is a British politician serving as the Member of Parliament (MP) for the Ribble Valley constituency in Lancashire since 1992. A member of the Conservative Party, he was Joint Executive Secretary of the 1922 Committee from 2017 to 2019. He served as First Deputy Chairman of Ways and Means, one of the Speaker's three deputies, from 2010 to 2013. He was elected as Second Deputy Chairman of Ways and Means in 2020.

He is a strong critic of the European Union and supported Brexit in the 2016 EU Referendum. He has since been supportive of Leave Means Leave, a Eurosceptic campaign group and backed Boris Johnson for Prime Minister. He has however since refrained from campaigning on issues such as Brexit in order to fulfill his role as one of the deputy speakers.

Early life
Evans was born on 10 November 1957 in Swansea. He was educated locally at the Dynevor School, and at University College of Swansea, where he gained a Bachelor of Arts degree in politics in 1979. He was involved in the management of his family's newsagent's and convenience store in Swansea.

Political career
In 1985, Evans was elected as a councillor to the West Glamorgan County Council. In 1990, he became the deputy Conservative group leader, before standing down as a councillor in 1991. He contested Swansea West at the general election of 1987, but was defeated by former minister Alan Williams by 7,062 votes. He was selected to contest the 1989 Pontypridd by-election in Pontypridd, following the death of Brynmor John, the seat's Labour MP. Evans was defeated by Kim Howells by 10,794 votes.

He fought his third election in the same parliament when he was selected to contest the normally "safe" Conservative seat of Ribble Valley, in the by-election caused by the resignation of David Waddington to become the Leader of the House of Lords in 1990. Evans was again defeated on 7 March 1991, when Mike Carr gained the seat for the Liberal Democrats by 4,601 votes.

Evans won Ribble Valley from the Liberal Democrats at the general election of 1992, defeating Carr by 6,542 votes, and has remained the constituency's MP since then. He made his maiden speech on 20 May 1992.

He was appointed as the Parliamentary Private Secretary (PPS) to the Secretary of State for Employment David Hunt in 1993, and remained Hunt's PPS when he was appointed Chancellor of the Duchy of Lancaster in 1994. In 1995, Evans became the PPS to Tony Baldry the Minister of State at the Ministry of Agriculture, Fisheries and Food in 1995, and in 1996, he became the PPS to the new Secretary of State for Wales William Hague.

With the Conservative Party not winning a single seat in Wales at the general election of 1997, Evans was drafted onto the frontbench by former prime minister John Major as a spokesman on Welsh Affairs. He became a member of the Shadow Cabinet under Iain Duncan Smith as the Shadow Secretary of State for Wales from 2001 to 2003. He had publicly criticised the government for not having a dedicated Secretary of State for Wales in a cabinet post, so when the new Conservative leader Michael Howard decided to take the role outside of the Shadow Cabinet, Evans chose to return to the backbenches.

He became a member of both the Trade and Industry and the Welsh Affairs Select committees in 2003. In November 2004, Evans was appointed a Vice-Chairman of the Conservative Party, with specific responsibility for overseeing Conservatives Abroad and mobilising the Conservative vote overseas. He returned to the back benches on the election of David Cameron as party leader in 2005, deciding to dedicate more time to his work on the Council of Europe and Western European Union. He has been a member of the Culture Media and Sport Select Committee since the general election of 2005.

In November 2009, Evans was ranked as the 570th most expensive MP out of the 646 MPs in the UK Parliament, based on his expenses claims. Criticism was drawn over his £375 a month expense on phone bills, and his purchase of four digital cameras in 18 months. Evans later attracted criticism for saying that he struggled to live on his salary of over £64,000 per year. He responded by saying that the comments were made in jest.

On 8 June 2010, Evans was elected First Deputy Chairman of Ways and Means, and a Deputy Speaker of the House of Commons. This was the first time the three Deputy Speakers had been elected by secret ballot of all MPs. Evans supported Brexit in the 2016 European Union referendum.

Evans is a supporter of the proposal to make 23 June a public holiday in the United Kingdom, to be known as British Independence Day. Following a Parliamentary debate on the topic, the announcement from the UK government in October 2016 to not proceed with the holiday at present, he said it was "a shame the government has made this decision, this is an absolute belter of an idea."

On 8 January 2020, he was elected as Second Deputy Chairman of Ways and Means by the MPs.

Arrest and trial
On 4 May 2013, Evans was arrested on suspicion of rape and sexual assault. His trial began on 10 March 2014. He was acquitted of all charges on 10 April 2014. In 2012, he had supported cuts to legal aid which became part of the Legal Aid, Sentencing and Punishment of Offenders Act 2012 (LASPO); after losing his life savings defending himself in 2014, Evans said in 2018 that the experience had shown him that "It's wrong, completely wrong, to remove people's right to have expert legal representation ... We're definitely talking about justice being denied as a result of LASPO." Hannah Quirk, a criminal law lecturer at King's College London, referred to him as a victim of the so-called 'innocence tax'.

Personal life
On 18 December 2010, following the death of his 86-year-old mother, Evans revealed to The Mail on Sunday that he was gay. He lives in Pendleton, Lancashire, a village in his constituency.

References

External links
Nigel Evans MP official site

ePolitix.com – Nigel Evans MP
Guardian Unlimited Politics – Ask Aristotle: Nigel Evans MP

|-

|-

|-

1957 births
Conservative Party (UK) MPs for English constituencies
Gay politicians
Independent members of the House of Commons of the United Kingdom
Independent politicians in the United Kingdom
LGBT members of the Parliament of the United Kingdom
Welsh LGBT politicians
Living people
Members of the Privy Council of the United Kingdom
People acquitted of sex crimes
People educated at Dynevor School, Swansea
Politicians from Swansea
UK MPs 1992–1997
UK MPs 1997–2001
UK MPs 2001–2005
UK MPs 2005–2010
UK MPs 2010–2015
UK MPs 2015–2017
UK MPs 2017–2019
UK MPs 2019–present
Welsh politicians
British Eurosceptics